is the pen name of a Japanese manga artist. Her real name is Atsuko Naruse, and her maiden name was Katou. She is best known for her manga Hime-chan's Ribbon, which was published in Ribon.

She is good friends with fellow manga artists, Wataru Yoshizumi, Ai Yazawa and Miho Obana.

Manga
 Caramel Diary
 Chime
 Daisuki!
 Gogatsu no Ochakai
 Hime-chan's Ribbon
 Kami-sama no Orgel
 Kimagure na Yokan
 Kirakira 100%
 Kokoro ni Sotto Sasayaite (debut)
 Naisho no Princess
 Nemuri-hime no Eve
 Oshaberi na Jikanwari
 Piyo Piyo Tenshi
 Ponytail Hakusho
 Sora Iro no Melody
 Toe Shoes
Flowery Dress

References

External links
Chime - fan site

1963 births
Living people
Manga artists from Osaka Prefecture
Waseda University alumni